Sarvestan ( Sarvestân, "land of cedars"; sarv "cedar" (cypress) + estan; also Romanized as Sarvestān and Sarvistān) is a city and capital of Sarvestan County, Fars Province, Iran.  At the 2006 census, its population was 16,846, in 4,094 families.

The majority of people in Sarvestan are Persians. Many tropical and sub-tropical plants are grown in Sarvestan (i.e. Wheat, Pistachios, Olive). The yoghurt of Sarvestan is very famous.

History

Sarvestan's history goes back some 2600 years when the Achaemenids established the Persian Empire. The Sassanid monument of Sasanids' Palace (Kakhe Sasan) is located in south east of the city 90 km from Shiraz, experts believe the monument was constructed during the Sasanid dynastic era (224-651 A.D), and it was either a governing palace or a Zoroastrian temple, probably a fire temple. The monument was registered in Iran's National Heritage list in 1956, but the site in danger as the result of unprofessional restorations. Sarvestan is the birthplace of Sheikh Yusef Sarvestani, who was a moralist.

Vegetation
More of the county have gramineous vegetation and two types including tree and shrub.

Colleges and universities
Based on public census in 2006, about 76% of Sarvestanis are literate and 10.5% have academic educations.
There are two major universities in the city:

 Islamic Azad University of Sarvestan
 Payame Noor University of Sarvestan

References

 kk

 
Populated places in Sarvestan County
Cities in Fars Province